Uraicecht Becc (Old Irish for "Small Primer"; uraicecht is a variant of airaiccecht [air- 'before' + aiccecht 'instruction,' from Latin acceptum], 'primer') is an Old Irish legal tract on status. Of all status tracts, it has the greatest breadth in coverage, including not only commoners, kings, churchmen and poets, but also a variety of other professional groups, including judges. However, it does not go into as much detail for each group and level as do other status tracts. T.M. Charles-Edwards suggests that it is "almost certainly of Munster origin", as it asserts the supremacy of the king of Munster above other Irish kings and makes reference to the monasteries of Emly and Cork.

Poets
The Small Primer goes into detail regarding the poets' place in Irish society. It lists the seven grades of poets, including their honor price, and the pay earned for the various meters they could perform.

Edition
D.A. Binchy, Corpus Iuris Hibernici: 1590–1618; 634–655; 2318–2335; & 2255–2282.

See also
Early Irish law

References

Further reading
Binchy, D. “The date and provenance of Uraicecht becc.” Ériu 18 (1958). pp. 44–54.
Henry, P.L. “A Note on the Brehon Law Tracts of Procedure and Status, Coic Conara fugill and Uraicecht Becc.” ZCP 49 (1997). pp. 311–9.
Mac Neill, Eoin. Celtic Ireland. Dublin, 1921. 
Mac Neill, Eoin. "Ancient Irish Law: the law of status or franchise." Proceedings of the Royal Irish Academy 36 C (1923): 265–316: 272–91.

Early Gaelic legal texts